Theodosios Pavlidis (born September 8, 1934 in Thessaloniki) is a computer scientist and Distinguished Professor Emeritus of Computer Science at the State University of New York, Stony Brook.

Education
Pavlidis studied at the National Technical University of Athens, where in 1957 he received his Diploma in Mechanical and Electrical Engineering degree. He continued to study at the University of California, Berkeley, where he received his MS in Electrical Engineering in 1962 and his PhD in Electrical Engineering in 1964.

Career
Pavlidis taught at Princeton University, starting as an assistant professor in 1964, promoted to Associate Professor in 1968 and Full Professor in 1975.  In 1980, he joined AT&T Bell Laboratories in Murray Hill, New Jersey as a Member of Technical Staff.  While at Bell Labs, in 1982, he was appointed Senior Editor of the IEEE Transactions on Pattern Analysis and Machine Intelligence (PAMI) and held that position through 1986.  Pavlidis resumed teaching in 1986, first as a Leading Professor, and then as a distinguished professor in 1995, becoming emeritus in 2001.

Pavlidis conducted fundamental research in several computer software technology areas, including pattern recognition, image analysis, picture editing, OCR, computer vision, and barcodes. He contributed to the PDF417 two-dimensional barcode ISO standard, allowing for the barcode itself to have very high information density and error correction. His work in computer vision resulted in an algorithm that could scan barcodes that are poorly printed or defaced/dirty.

Pavlidis has published several books, and numerous articles and papers in leading engineering journals and conference proceedings. He is also a named inventor on 15 U.S. issued patents.

Additional aspects of Pavlidis' career may be found in the sidebar of his IAPR profile.

Honors and awards

Books
 Biological Oscillators: Their Mathematical Analysis. Academic Press, 1973.
 Structural Pattern Recognition. Springer-Verlag, 1977.
 Algorithms for Graphics and Image Processing. Computer Science Press, 1982.
 Interactive Computer Graphics in X. PWS Publishing, 1995.
 Fundamentals of X Programming. Kluwer Academic/Plenum Publishers, 1999.

References

1934 births
Living people
Greek emigrants to the United States
National Technical University of Athens alumni
UC Berkeley College of Engineering alumni
Computer scientists
Greek computer scientists
Princeton University faculty
Fellow Members of the IEEE
Scientists from Thessaloniki
Fellows of the International Association for Pattern Recognition